Girolamo Pietraperzia Barresi (c.1502 – 15 March 1549) was a Sicilian nobleman, marquis or prince of Pietraperzia, who was decapitated in Palermo after a prolonged process for the crime of murder and parricide. His sentence for the murder of his father, Matteo Barresi, and two servants in 1533 was based on a confession obtained under torture. His sentence  was initially commuted by Holy Roman emperor Charles V, after extracting some hefty fines, but the new viceroy Juan de Vega ultimately enforced the death sentence. He was buried in the church of San Domenico, Palermo.

Girolamo was one of the patrons of the mathematician and astronomer Francesco Maurolico. Girolamo had two children with Antonina, member of the Branciforte and Santapau families. Pietro died without progeny. His daughter, Dorotea Barresi e Santapau, after widowing twice, including Giovanni III Ventimiglia, she married the new viceroy of Naples Juan de Zúñiga y Requesens. She then moved to Spain where she participated in the upbringing of King Philip V of Spain.

References

1502 births
1549 deaths
Sicilian nobility
People executed by decapitation
16th-century Sicilian people